The following television stations operate on virtual channel 51 in the United States:

 K05IZ-D in Hinsdale, Montana
 K09ES-D in Cashmere, Washington
 K09HY-D in Glasgow, Montana
 K09YE-D in La Pine, Oregon
 K11EZ-D in Cashmere, Washington
 K14JZ-D in Peetz, Colorado
 K17MJ-D in San Antonio, Texas
 K24FU-D in Pleasant Valley, Colorado
 K25PV-D in Yakima, Washington
 K27IH-D in Holyoke, Colorado
 K28JH-D in Yuma, Colorado
 K29GV-D in Hagerman, Idaho
 K29HD-D in Idalia, Colorado
 K31IH-D in Wray, Colorado
 K31IQ-D in Sterling, Colorado
 K33PZ-D in Julesburg, Colorado
 K40MT-D in Bonners Ferry, Idaho
 K43MH-D in Vesta, Minnesota
 K51BA-D in Fort Peck, Montana
 K51DB-D in Cortez, etc., Colorado
 K51DF-D in Milton-Freewater, Oregon
 K51DR-D in Wenatchee, Washington
 KBZO-LD in Lubbock, Texas
 KFXK-TV in Longview, Texas
 KFXL-LD in Lufkin, Texas
 KFXL-TV in Lincoln, Nebraska
 KHDS-LD in Salina, Kansas
 KHFD-LD in Dallas, Texas
 KHPN-LD in Warrenton, Oregon
 KMSX-LD in Sacramento, California
 KNSO in Merced, California
 KNWA-TV in Rogers, Arkansas
 KOHD in Bend, Oregon
 KPPX-TV in Tolleson, Arizona
 KPTD-LP in Paris, Texas
 KUHD-LD in Ventura, California
 KUMO-LD in St. Louis, Missouri
 KUNS-TV in Bellevue, Washington
 KUSI-TV in San Diego, California
 KVGA-LD in Las Vegas, Nevada
 KWHS-LD in Colorado Springs, Colorado
 KXAD-LD in Amarillo, Texas
 KYAZ in Katy, Texas
 W27DZ-D in Mayaguez, Puerto Rico
 WBIF in Marianna, Florida
 WEIU-TV in Charleston, Illinois
 WHSU-CD in Syracuse, New York
 WJSJ-CD in Tipton, Indiana
 WLZE-LD in Fort Myers, Florida
 WNYA in Pittsfield, Massachusetts
 WOGX in Ocala, Florida
 WPXJ-TV in Batavia, New York
 WPXT in Portland, Maine
 WRIW-CD in Providence, Rhode Island
 WSCV in Fort Lauderdale, Florida
 WSFG-LD in Berry, Alabama
 WSFJ-TV in Newark, Ohio
 WSIO-LD in Galesburg, Illinois
 WSQY-LD in Spartanburg, South Carolina
 WSSF-LD in Fayette, Alabama
 WTBL-LD in Pascagoula, Mississippi
 WTVE in Reading, Pennsylvania
 WVPT in Staunton, Virginia
 WYAM-LD in Priceville, Alabama
 WYJH-LD in White Lake, New York

The following stations, which are no longer licensed, formerly operated on virtual channel 51 in the United States:
 K30QF-D in Hermiston, Washington
 KBIT-LD in Chico, California
 W51CW-D in Wilmington, North Carolina
 WQEH-LD in Jackson, Tennessee

References

51 virtual TV stations in the United States